The United States competed at the 2019 World Championships in Athletics in Doha, Qatar, from 27 September–6 October 2019.  The selection meet for these championships was the 2019 USA Outdoor Track and Field Championships.

Results

Men
Track and road events

* – Indicates the athlete competed in preliminaries but not the final

Field events

Combined events – Decathlon

Women
Track and road events

* – Indicates the athlete competed in preliminaries but not the final

Field events

Combined events – Heptathlon

Mixed

References

Nations at the 2019 World Athletics Championships
World Championships in Athletics
2019